Mugachintala is an Indian village located in Kondapi mandal of Prakasam district, Andhra Pradesh. In 2011, the village was home to 365 families with a total population of 2061: 1058 males and 1003 females.

References

Villages in Prakasam district